Tiedemann is both a surname and a given name of German origin, a variant of Thiedemann. Notable people with the name include:

Surname:
 Carlo von Tiedemann
 Dietrich Tiedemann (1748–1803), psychologist
 Friedrich Tiedemann, physiologist
 Heinrich von Tiedemann, Prussian politician
 Mark W. Tiedemann, science fiction writer
 Neil Edward Tiedemann (born 1948), Auxiliary Bishop of Brooklyn and Titular Bishop of Cova
 Pyotr Genrikhovich Tiedemann (1872–1941), Russian diplomat
 R. G. Tiedemann (1941–2019), historian
 Ricky Tiedemann (born 2002), American baseball player

Given name:
 Tiedemann Giese, bishop and friend of Copernicus

See also 
 
 
 Thijmen, Dutch variant

References 

German-language surnames
German masculine given names
Surnames from given names